Sharon Friedlander is a fictional character appearing in American comic books published by Marvel Comics. The character most often appears in X-Men stories in the Marvel Universe. Sharon first appeared in New Mutants #19 (1984). She was created by Chris Claremont and Bill Sienkiewicz. Her last appearance was in The Uncanny X-Men #298 (March 1993).

Fictional character biography
Sharon's first meeting with mutants associated with the X-Men, was when the New Mutants brought in Dani Moonstar to the Mid-County Medical Center. Sharon was employed in the emergency room as a nurse. A short time later, Sharon and police officer Tom Corsi were abducted by a creature called the Demon Bear, who had mauled Dani Moonstar during a battle outside the Xavier Institute earlier that night. The Demon Bear attempted to transform Friedlander and Corsi into his demonic slaves. After the New Mutants defeated the bear, Tom and Sharon were returned to their natural human form, with a couple of physical changes: the two of them acquired features similar to Native Americans (previously they were both White Americans), along with being enhanced to the level of being perfect human specimens.

After her initial encounter with the New Mutants, Sharon joined the staff at Xavier's School for Gifted Youngsters, as a nurse and confidante. She stayed in the capacity of a nurse for a while. Sharon and Tom Corsi had a brief romantic interest in each other, which was later used against them by Empath, one of the Hellions. Empath used his power over human emotions to make their romantic feelings into obsessive ones, distracting them while he manipulated Magneto into a deep depression. At this time, Magneto was assuming duties as headmaster of Xavier's school and guardianship over the New Mutants. While Magneto was still vulnerable, Emma Frost transferred the New Mutants to her school.

Sharon stayed on at Xavier's School for some time, until the New Mutants found themselves in Asgard; Sharon and Tom appeared less frequently in the X-titles by then. Eventually, Sharon was a resident of Muir Island with Moira MacTaggert. 

In her last appearance, some time later, Sharon made herself a quiet life. She was at a school for the handicapped, called Our Mother of the Sacred Heart. The school found itself under attack by a new of group of Acolytes. These villains mistakenly though a powerful mutant child was attending the school. Sharon was killed by the Acolyte Joanna Cargill when she was struck in the jaw, snapping her neck in the process. Her final act was to send a mental call for help to Professor X.

Powers and abilities
Sharon had minor increased strength due to her transformation by the Demon Bear as well as minor increased speed and reflexes.

References

Characters created by Bill Sienkiewicz
Characters created by Chris Claremont
Comics characters introduced in 1984
Fictional Cheyenne people
Fictional nurses
Marvel Comics characters with superhuman strength
Marvel Comics female superheroes
Marvel Comics mutates